Douglas Ma'afu Hawke, better known as Doug "Vicious" Viney (born 20 November 1976) is a Tongan-New Zealander heavyweight boxer and kickboxer.  He is the K-1 World GP 2007 in Las Vegas champion, who also represented Tonga as a super heavyweight boxer under the name of Ma'afu Hawke at 2004 Summer Olympics in Athens, Greece.

Biography and career
Viney made his K-1 debut on 21 July 2001 at the K-1 New Zealand Grand Prix 2001. He knocked out Dion Crouch and Auckland Aumitagi in the quarter and semi-finals, respectively, before going on to face Rony Sefo in the final, who he defeated via decision. He then went on to the K-1 World Grand Prix 2002 Preliminary Melbourne in February 2002, where he was defeated in the semi-finals by Andrew Peck after beating Chris Chrisopoulides in the quarters. In November 2002, he again entered the New Zealand Grand Prix at K-1 New Zealand 2002 where he reached the final only to be defeated by Jason Suttie.

He then went on to lose his next two fights after this also, and then switched to the sport of boxing. In the summer of 2004, he represented Tonga as a super heavyweight boxer under the name of Ma'afu Hawke at 2004 Summer Olympics in Athens, Greece. After the Olympics, he made his professional boxing debut on 3 September 2005 by defeating Junior Pati by decision.

He returned to kickboxing in 2006, winning his first three fights, including a decision win over Peter Graham. On 4 May 2007, he took part in the eight-man tournament at K-1 Fighting Network Romania 2007 and was defeated in the quarter-finals by Brecht Wallis. Three months later, on 11 August, he was reserve fighter at the K-1 World Grand Prix 2007 in Las Vegas. After defeating Mahmoud Fawzy in the reserve match, he was called in to the semi-finals to face Aleksandr Pitchkounov after Rick Cheek pulled out of the tournament with an injury. He was able to defeat Aleksandr Pitchkounov, and then went on to beat Zabit Samedov in the final.

After winning the Las Vegas Grand Prix, he was given a place in the last 16 of the 2007 K-1 World Grand Prix. He was knocked out in round 2 by Badr Hari at the K-1 World Grand Prix 2007 in Seoul Final 16. He then returned in 2008 at the K-1 World Grand Prix 2008 in Amsterdam where he rematched Zabit Samedov in the semi-finals. Samedov was able to take his revenge, winning by decision and knocking Viney out of the tournament.

Kickboxing record

|-  bgcolor="#FFBBBB"
| 2012-08-25 || Loss ||align=left| Paul Slowinski || Capital Punishment 6 || Canberra, Australia || Decision || 3 || 3:00
|-  bgcolor="#CCFFCC"
| 2012-03-17 || Win || align="left" | Eric Nosa || Kings of Kombat 6 || Keysborough, Australia || Decision || 3 || 3:00
|-  bgcolor="#FFBBBB"
| 2010-08-29 || Loss ||align=left| Peter Graham || Kings of Kombat || Keysborough, Australia || TKO || 5 || 
|-  bgcolor="#FFBBBB"
| 2009-04-12 || Loss ||align=left| Sebastian Ciobanu || Local Kombat 33 || Romania || Decision (Unanimous) || 3 || 3:00
|-  bgcolor="#CCFFCC"
| 2008-09-12 || Win ||align=left| Erhan Deniz || K-1 Slovakia 2008 || Bratislava, Slovakia || Decision || 3 || 3:00
|-  bgcolor="#FFBBBB"
| 2008-04-26 || Loss ||align=left| Zabit Samedov || K-1 World Grand Prix 2008 in Amsterdam Quarter Finals || Amsterdam, Netherlands || Decision (Unanimous) || 3 || 3:00
|-
! style=background:white colspan=9 |
|-
|-  bgcolor="#FFBBBB"
| 2007-09-11 || Loss ||align=left| Badr Hari || K-1 World Grand Prix 2007 in Seoul Final 16 || Seoul, Korea || KO (Straight right punch) || 2 || 1:23
|-
! style=background:white colspan=9 |
|-
|-  bgcolor="#CCFFCC"
| 2007-08-11 || Win ||align=left| Zabit Samedov || K-1 World Grand Prix 2007 in Las Vegas Final || Las Vegas, NV, United States || Decision (Unanimous) || 3 || 3:00
|-
! style=background:white colspan=9 |
|-
|-  bgcolor="#CCFFCC"
| 2007-08-11 || Win ||align=left| Aleksandr Pitchkounov || K-1 World Grand Prix 2007 in Las Vegas Semi Finals || Las Vegas, NV, United States || Decision (Unanimous) || 3 || 3:00
|-  bgcolor="#CCFFCC"
| 2007-08-11 || Win ||align=left| Mahmoud Fawzy || K-1 World Grand Prix 2007 in Las Vegas Reserve Fight || Las Vegas, NV, United States || TKO (2 knockdowns/Right uppercut) || 1 || 2:08
|-  bgcolor="#FFBBBB"
| 2007-05-04 || Loss ||align=left| Brecht Wallis || K-1 Fighting Network Romania 2007 Quarter Finals || Bucharest, Romania || KO (Left roundhouse kick) || 3 || 0:50 
|-
! style=background:white colspan=9 |
|-
|-  bgcolor="#CCFFCC"
| 2006-11-18 || Win ||align=left| Peter Graham || K-1 Kings of Oceania 2006 Round 3 || Auckland, New Zealand || Decision (Unanimous) || 3 || 3:00 
|-  bgcolor="#CCFFCC"
| 2006-09-24 || Win ||align=left| Matt Samoa || K-1 Kings of Oceania 2006 Round 2 || Auckland, New Zealand || Decision || 3 || 3:00 
|-  bgcolor="#CCFFCC"
| 2006-06-24 || Win ||align=left| Andrew Peck || K-1 Kings of Oceania 2006 Round 1 || Auckland, New Zealand || Decision || 3 || 3:00
|-  bgcolor="#FFBBBB"
| 2003-09-12 || Loss ||align=left| Gordan Jukic || K-1 Final Fight || Split, Croatia|| KO (High Kick) ||1 || 2:40
|-  bgcolor="#FFBBBB"
| 2003-04-11 || Loss ||align=left| Gordan Jukic || K-1 Lord of the Rings || Auckland, New Zealand || TKO || 2 || 
|-  bgcolor="#FFBBBB"
| 2002-11-08 || Loss ||align=left| Jason Suttie || K-1 New Zealand 2002 Final || Auckland, New Zealand || KO || 3 || 1:32
|-
! style=background:white colspan=9 |
|-
|-  bgcolor="#CCFFCC"
| 2002-11-08 || Win ||align=left| Andrew Peck || K-1 New Zealand 2002 Semi Finals || Auckland, New Zealand || Decision || 3 || 3:00
|-  bgcolor="#CCFFCC"
| 2002-11-08 || Win ||align=left| Oliva Tuisafia || K-1 New Zealand 2002 Quarter Finals || Auckland, New Zealand || KO || 1 || 2:55
|-  bgcolor="#FFBBBB"
| 2002-02-18 || Loss ||align=left| Andrew Peck || K-1 World Grand Prix 2002 Preliminary Melbourne Semi Finals || Melbourne, Australia || KO || 1 || 1:38
|-
! style=background:white colspan=9 |
|-
|-  bgcolor="#CCFFCC"
| 2002-02-18 || Win ||align=left| Chris Chrisopoulides || K-1 World Grand Prix 2002 Preliminary Melbourne Quarter Finals || Melbourne, Australia || TKO || 2 || 2:59
|-  bgcolor="#CCFFCC"
| 2001-07-21 || Win ||align=left| Rony Sefo || K-1 New Zealand Grand Prix 2001 Final || Auckland, New Zealand || Decision (Unanimous) || 3 || 3:00
|-
! style=background:white colspan=9 |
|-
|-  bgcolor="#CCFFCC"
| 2001-07-21 || Win ||align=left| Auckland Aumitagi || K-1 New Zealand Grand Prix 2001 Semi Finals || Auckland, New Zealand || TKO || || 
|-  bgcolor="#CCFFCC"
| 2001-07-21 || Win ||align=left| Dion Crouch || K-1 New Zealand Grand Prix 2001 Quarter Finals || Auckland, New Zealand || KO || 2 ||  
|-
| colspan=9 | Legend:

Mixed martial arts record

|-
|Loss
|align=center| 0-1
| James McSweeney
| Submission (rear naked choke)
|Shamrock Events Kings of Kombat 5
|
|align=center| 1
|align=center| 2:30
|Keysborough, Victoria, Australia
|
|-

Boxing record

| style="text-align:center;" colspan="8"|1 Wins, 0 Losses, 0 Draws
|-
|align=center style="border-style: none none solid solid; background: #e3e3e3"|Result
|align=center style="border-style: none none solid solid; background: #e3e3e3"|Record
|align=center style="border-style: none none solid solid; background: #e3e3e3"|Opponent
|align=center style="border-style: none none solid solid; background: #e3e3e3"|Type
|align=center style="border-style: none none solid solid; background: #e3e3e3"|Round, Time
|align=center style="border-style: none none solid solid; background: #e3e3e3"|Date
|align=center style="border-style: none none solid solid; background: #e3e3e3"|Location
|align=center style="border-style: none none solid solid; background: #e3e3e3"|Notes
|-align=center
|Win
|1-0
|align=left| Junior Pati
|PTS||4 
|2005-09-03 || align=left| Auckland, New Zealand
|align=left| Pro debut.

Titles 
2007 K-1 World Grand Prix Las Vegas 8 man Champion
2006 Kings of Oceania Champion
2004 Athens Summer Olympian
2004 Oceania Amateur Heavyweight Boxing Champion
2001 K-1 New Zealand 8 man Champion

See also 
List of male kickboxers
List of K-1 Events
List of K-1 champions

References

External links
 
Doug Viney's profile at Official K-1 Website

1976 births
Living people
New Zealand male kickboxers
Tongan male kickboxers
Heavyweight kickboxers
Tongan male boxers
Cruiserweight boxers
Heavyweight boxers
Boxers at the 2004 Summer Olympics
Olympic boxers of Tonga
New Zealand Muay Thai practitioners
Sportspeople from Auckland
New Zealand sportspeople of Tongan descent
New Zealand male boxers
Fighters trained by Lolo Heimuli
Boxers from Auckland
SUPERKOMBAT kickboxers
New Zealand male mixed martial artists
Mixed martial artists utilizing boxing
Mixed martial artists utilizing Muay Thai